Surroundings are the area around a given physical or geographical point or place.  The exact definition depends on the field. Surroundings can also be used in geography (when it is more precisely known as vicinity, or vicinage) and mathematics, as well as philosophy, with the literal or metaphorically extended definition.

In thermodynamics, the term (and its synonym, environment) is used in a more restricted sense, meaning everything outside the thermodynamic system. Often, the simplifying assumptions are that energy and matter may move freely within the surroundings, and that the surroundings have a uniform composition.

See also 

Distance
Environment (biophysical)
Environment (systems)
Neighbourhood (mathematics)
Social environment
Proxemics

Geography
Thermodynamics